The Minute You Wake Up Dead is a 2022 American noir thriller film directed by Michael Mailer and starring Cole Hauser, Morgan Freeman and Jaimie Alexander.

Cast
Morgan Freeman as Sheriff Thurmond Fowler
Cole Hauser as Russ Potter
Jaimie Alexander as Delaine Moore
Darren Mann as Lucius McFalls

Production
Filming began in Mississippi in February 2022.

In May 2022, it was announced that Grindstone Entertainment will distribute the film in North America.

Release
The film was released in theaters, on demand and digital platforms on November 4, 2022 and was released on DVD and Blu-ray December 13, 2022.

Reception
The film has a 0% rating on Rotten Tomatoes based on six reviews.

Lukas Spathis of Voices from the Balcony gave the movie one and a half stars out of 5, detailing that "The Minute You Wake up Dead is a weak movie that descends into being a bad one thanks to its insistence on using every trope."

References

External links
 

American comedy thriller films
Films shot in Mississippi